Courtney Peebles (born March 4, 1979), better known as J.R., is a Christian singer and producer formerly signed to Cross Movement Records. He is also half of the So Hot Productions team along with N.A.B. His debut album was Metamorphosis, released in 2005. J.R. often appears on the hooks of songs by fellow labelmates, such as FLAME and Da' T.R.U.T.H. He was expected to release his second album, Life by Stereo, in September 2007; however, it was pushed back to December. In 2009, J.R. left Cross Movement Records and went indie to work on a new sound.

Discography

Studio albums

Mixtapes
"Murray's Grammar: New Rules"
Released: April 2011

Singles
"Lights So Bright"
"Always"

Music videos
"Not a Slave"
"Love"

With High Society
 Circa MMXI: The Collective (2012)

Guest appearances
"Closer to You" by The Cross Movement
"Cry No More" by The Cross Movement
"N.F.L." by Da' T.R.U.T.H.
"Open My Heart" by FLAME
"On This Day" Gift Rap (Cross Movement album)
"My Clothes, My Hair" by The Ambassador
"2 Is Better" by Da' T.R.U.T.H.
"Racial Diversity" by FLAME feat. Elinor
"Wars of the Mind" by FLAME
"Smile" by R-Swift
"Grateful" by Lecrae
"Lookin' For Love" by Trip Lee
"Grace" by Json
"Significance" by Tedashii
"Hey Girl" by Everyday Process
"Goodbye" by FLAME feat. Json
"Joy to Me" by Thi'sl
"Me on My SoapBox" by R-Swift
"Eyes Open" by Trip Lee
"Father in You" by Future
"Flesh Killa" by Sean Slaughter
"Love & Grace" by The Ambassador feat. Da' T.R.U.T.H.
"Identity" by Lecrae feat. Da' T.R.U.T.H.
"So Elektrik" by Rio
"Calling You by KJ-52
"Nothing Without You" by DJ Official feat. Lecrae
"We Can Be More" by Sho Baraka
"Divine Intervention" by Lecrae
"Tonight (All of Me)" by FLAME
"Parent Me" by Json
"Secrets" by Json
"Gravity" by Lecrae
"Bloodlines" by Alex Faith
"Never Land" by Andy Mineo
"On My Mind" by Swoope
"Freedom" by Alex Faith
"No Rival" by Crowder

External links
 Cross Movement Records
 So Hot Productions
 J.R.'s website

Cross Movement Records
1979 births
Living people
Musicians from St. Louis
Musicians from Philadelphia
Place of birth missing (living people)